Alison Jane Inverarity (born 12 August 1970) is a former Australian Olympic and Commonwealth athlete, competing in the high jump. She was affiliated with the Western Australian Institute of Sport in Perth.

This record stood until February 2020.

Inverarity competed at three Olympic Games, two Commonwealth Games and two World Championships. She won a gold medal at the 1994 Commonwealth Games.

Personal 
Inverarity was born on 12 August 1970 in Perth, Western Australia.

National titles
8 times Australian high jump champion: 1991, 1993–95, 1997–2000

International competitions

References

External links 
 
 Alison Inverarity at Australian Athletics Historical Results
 
 
 
 
 

1970 births
Living people
Athletes from Perth, Western Australia
Australian female high jumpers
Olympic athletes of Australia
Athletes (track and field) at the 1992 Summer Olympics
Athletes (track and field) at the 1996 Summer Olympics
Athletes (track and field) at the 2000 Summer Olympics
Commonwealth Games gold medallists for Australia
Commonwealth Games bronze medallists for Australia
Commonwealth Games medallists in athletics
Athletes (track and field) at the 1994 Commonwealth Games
Athletes (track and field) at the 1998 Commonwealth Games
World Athletics Championships athletes for Australia
People educated at Pembroke School, Adelaide
Western Australian Institute of Sport alumni
Universiade medalists in athletics (track and field)
Universiade gold medalists for Australia
Medalists at the 1991 Summer Universiade
Medallists at the 1994 Commonwealth Games
Medallists at the 1998 Commonwealth Games